Holt Castle was a medieval castle in the town of Holt, Wrexham County Borough, Wales. Work began in the 13th century during the Welsh Wars, the castle was sited on the Welsh–English border by the banks of the River Dee.

In the medieval period, the five-towered fortress was actually known as Castrum Leonis or Castle Lyons because it had a lion motif carved into the stonework above its main gate. In the 17th century, almost all the stonework was removed from the site; only the sandstone foundation and a small amount of masonry survives.

Construction

It was shaped like a pentagon with towers at each corner.

The castle had a stepped ramp up to a main gateway, barbican, inner ward, postern and curtain walls. There was also a water-filled moat that was fed from the River Dee.

The design of the castle featured towers that were built against the face of the rock outside the curtain wall, similar to the inner wards at Ruthin and at Conwy.

History

Holt castle was started by Edward I on a sandstone base next to the River Dee soon after the invasion of North Wales in 1277. In 1282 Edward presented the Welsh lands in which Holt was situated to loyal lord  John de Warrene, who was also given the task of completing the castle. By 1311 the castle had been finished and a planned town laid out next to it for the use of English settlers.

A century later, Welsh forces burned down the town in 1400 during the uprising of Owain Glyndŵr; although the castle was not taken.
By the 16th century Holt Castle had fallen into disuse and ruin. The English Elizabethan map maker John Norden surveyed the castle and noted that it was "nowe in great decay".

For most of the First English Civil War, Holt was garrisoned by Royalists troops. It was captured by the Parliamentarians in 1643 but retaken by the Royalists in spring of 1644. After they had surrendered, thirteen of the Parliamentarian garrison were put to the sword  and their bodies were thrown into the moat. In January 1647, after a siege that lasted for nine months the Royalist governor, Sir Richard Lloyd, surrendered Holt to Thomas Mytton (the commander of the besieging Parliamentarians)—after Holt's surrender Harlech was the only stronghold in Wales still under Royalist control and it fell to Mytton in March of that year. After the surrender, Colonel Roger Pope was appointed Parliamentary governor of Holt. By order of Parliament, Holt was slighted later that year.

Between 1675 and 1683 much of the castle was taken away by Sir Thomas Grosvenor, 3rd Baronet of Eaton, who used barges to carry the stonework downstream to rebuild Eaton Hall after the English Civil War.

In the 18th century all that remained of Holt Castle was part of a tower and a rectangular building.

Preservation
The only sizeable part of Holt Castle that remains is perched on its sandstone base. Some masonry features are still visible, including the lower walls of the inner keep, the postern gate, a buttress, a chute exit and the foundations of the outer gate's square tower. In 2015, four years of extensive restoration work to remove vegetation, install steps and repair extant masonry was completed. A series of archaeological surveys of the site had also been undertaken.

See also
Roger Edgeworth
List of castles in Wales

References

Bibliography

External links

Photos and information on Holt Castle
Holt Castle - official site

Castles in Wrexham County Borough
Castle ruins in Wales
Grade II* listed castles in Wales
Grade II* listed buildings in Wrexham County Borough
Articles containing video clips
Massacres during the Wars of the Three Kingdoms
Massacres in 1644